Samuel Most (December 16, 1930 – June 13, 2013) was an American jazz flutist, clarinetist and tenor saxophonist, based in Los Angeles. He was "probably the first great jazz flutist", according to jazz historian Leonard Feather.

Biography
He was born in Atlantic City, New Jersey, and began his career in music at the age of 18 with the bands of Tommy Dorsey, Shep Fields, Boyd Raeburn and Don Redman.  He also performed many times with his older brother, clarinetist Abe Most.

His first recording was at age 23, a single called "Undercurrent Blues". The next year he was awarded DownBeat magazine's "Critic's New Star Award".  Between 1953 and 1958 Most led and recorded sessions for the Prestige, Debut, Vanguard and Bethlehem labels.  He also did session work for Chris Connor, Paul Quinichette and Teddy Wilson.   He was a member of the Buddy Rich band from 1959 to 1961.

Most resurfaced in the late 1970s recording six albums on the Xanadu label.

From 1987 Most, with producer Fernando Gelbard of Liquidjazz.com, recorded four albums, including Solo Flute.

He was the guest of and played for the King of Thailand three times.  He was the subject of Edmond Goff's documentary film Sam Most, Jazz Flutist (2001).

Sam Most died on June 13, 2013 from cancer, at Woodland Hills, Los Angeles. He was 82.

Discography

As leader
 I'm Nuts About the Most...Sam That Is! (Bethlehem, 1955)
 The Herbie Mann-Sam Most Quintet (Bethlehem, 1955)
 Musically Yours (Bethlehem, 1956)
 Plays Bird, Monk, and Miles (Bethlehem, 1957)
 The Amazing Mr. Sam Most (Bethlehem, 1957)
 Mostly Flute (Xanadu, 1976)
 But Beautiful (Catalyst, 1976)
 Flute Flight (Xanadu, 1977)
 Flute Talk (Xanadu, 1979)
 From the Attic of My Mind (Xanadu, 1980)
 Any Time, Any Season (Innovation, 1987)
 New Jazz Standards (Summit, 2014)

As sideman
 Louis Bellson, Thunderbird (Impulse!, 1965)
 Clare Fischer, Extension (Pacific Jazz, 1963)
 Stan Kenton, Hair (Capitol, 1969)
 Paul Quinichette, Moods (EmArcy, 1954)
 Lalo Schifrin, There's a Whole Lalo Schifrin Goin' On (Dot, 1968)
 Lalo Schifrin, Ins and Outs (Palo Alto, 1982)

References

External links

[ Sam Most biography at allmusic.com]
IMDB site for documentary on Sam Most
sammost.com
Sam Most at bebopflute.com

1930 births
2013 deaths
Jazz tenor saxophonists
Big band saxophonists
American jazz saxophonists
American male saxophonists
American jazz flautists
Musicians from Atlantic City, New Jersey
American Bahá'ís
Xanadu Records artists
Prestige Records artists
20th-century Bahá'ís
21st-century Bahá'ís
Deaths from pancreatic cancer
American male jazz musicians
20th-century American saxophonists
20th-century flautists